Adolfo Saguier (b. 1832, d. 1902) was a Paraguayan politician who served as the nation's Vice President from 1878 to 1880.

Adolfo was the brother of a former Paraguayan ambassador to Argentina and a cousin of Francisco Solano López. During the rule of Carlos Antonio López he was sent to study in Europe. During the Paraguayan War he served in the army and commanded artillery in the Battle of Curupayty. During the last years of Lopez’s rule he led one of the conspiracy trials that led to the arrest, torture and execution of alleged plotters against Lopez. 

After the war he was associated with the Liberal politicians of the Decoud faction. He served as President of the Chamber of Deputies. He was Minister of Finance of Paraguay from 1875 to 1876.

Saguier was elected Vice President under Cándido Bareiro in 1878, and after the sudden death of Bareiro he was prevented from assuming Presidency by a bloodless coup organized by Bernardino Caballero on 4 September 1880. It was presented to the Senate, that Saguier has resigned and Caballero was elected president.

References

1832 births
1902 deaths
People from Luque
Paraguayan people of French descent
Liberal Party (Paraguay) politicians
Vice presidents of Paraguay
Finance Ministers of Paraguay
Presidents of the Chamber of Deputies of Paraguay
Presidents of the Senate of Paraguay
Paraguayan Freemasons
Paraguayan Army officers
Paraguayan military personnel of the Paraguayan War